Raoul Dufy (3 June 1877 – 23 March 1953) was a French Fauvist painter. He developed a colorful, decorative style that became fashionable for ceramics and textile designs, as well as decorative schemes for public buildings. He is noted for scenes of open-air social events. He was also a draftsman, printmaker, book illustrator, scenic designer, furniture designer and a planner of public spaces.

Biography

Early life
Dufy was born into a large family at Le Havre, in Normandy. His younger brother, Jean Dufy, also became an artist. Dufy left school at the age of fourteen to work in a coffee-importing company. In 1895, aged 18, he started taking evening classes in art at Le Havre's École des Beaux-Arts (municipal art school). The classes were taught by Charles Lhuillier, who had been a student of the French portrait painter Ingres 40 years earlier. There Dufy met  and Othon Friesz, with whom he later shared a studio in Montmartre and maintained a lifelong friendship. During this period, Dufy primarily painted Norman landscapes in watercolors.

In 1900, after a year of military service, Dufy won a scholarship to the École Nationale supérieure des Beaux-Arts in Paris, where again he crossed paths with Othon Friesz (he was also there when Georges Braque was studying). Dufy concentrated on improving his drawing skills and was profoundly influenced by the impressionist landscape painters, such as Claude Monet and Camille Pissarro. His first exhibition, at the Exhibition of French Artists, took place in 1901. Dufy was introduced to Berthe Weill in 1902 and showed his work in her gallery. He exhibited again in 1903, at the Salon des Indépendants. An early confidence boost came when the artist Maurice Denis bought one of his paintings. Dufy continued to paint, often in the vicinity of Le Havre and, in particular, on the beach at Sainte-Adresse, made famous by Eugène Boudin and Claude Monet. In 1904, he worked in Fecamp, on the English Channel (La Manche), with his friend Albert Marquet.

Later years

Henri Matisse's Luxe, Calme et Volupté, which Dufy saw at the Salon des Indépendants in 1905, directed his interests towards Fauvism. Les Fauves (the wild beasts) emphasized bright color and bold contours in their work. Dufy's painting reflected this aesthetic until about 1909, when contact with the work of Paul Cézanne led him to adopt a somewhat subtler technique. However, it was not until 1920, after he had flirted briefly with yet another style, Cubism, that Dufy developed his own distinctive approach. It involved skeletal structures arranged with foreshortened perspective, and the use of thin washes of color applied quickly, in a manner that came to be known as stenographic. Dufy's cheerful oils and watercolors depict events of the time period, such as yachting scenes, sparkling views of the French Riviera, chic parties and musical events. The optimistic, fashionably decorative and illustrative nature of much of Dufy's work has meant that his output has been less highly valued critically than the works of artists who have addressed a wider range of social concerns.

For the 1937 Exposition International in Paris, Dufy completed one of the largest paintings ever contemplated, a huge and immensely popular ode to electricity titled La Fée Electricité (painted in oil on plywood).

Dufy also acquired a reputation as an illustrator and commercial artist. He painted murals for public buildings and also produced a significant number of tapestries and ceramic designs. His plates appear in books by Guillaume Apollinaire, Stéphane Mallarmé and André Gide.

In 1909, Dufy was commissioned by Paul Poiret to design stationery for the house. After 1912, he designed textile patterns for Bianchini-Ferier, which were used for garments worn by Poiret and Charvet.

In the late 1940s and early 1950s, Dufy exhibited at the annual Salon des Tuileries in Paris. By 1950, his ability to paint was diminished when his hands were impaired by rheumatoid arthritis and he had to fasten a brush to his hand to work. In April he went to Boston to undergo an experimental treatment with cortisone and corticotropin, based on the work of Philip S. Hench. It proved successful, and some of his next works were dedicated to the doctors and researchers in the United States. In 1952 he received the grand prize for painting in the 26th Venice Biennale. Dufy died of intestinal bleeding at Forcalquier, France, on 23 March 1953, likely the result of his continuous treatment. He was buried near Matisse in the Cimiez Monastery Cemetery in Cimiez, a suburb of the city of Nice.

Collections
Among the public collections holding works by Raoul Dufy are:
 Art Gallery of Ontario, Canada
 Kalamazoo Institute of Arts, Kalamazoo, MI, USA
 McNay Art Museum, TX, USA
 Musée d'Art Moderne de Paris, France
 Museum de Fundatie, Zwolle, Netherlands
 National Gallery of Art, Washington, D.C., USA
 Van Abbemuseum, The Netherlands
 Virginia Museum of Fine Arts, Richmond, VA, USA

Works 

Hommage à Mozart , (Web Gallery Private Art Collection)
Le 14 juillet au Havre, rue pavoisée , (1906, Web Gallery Private Art Collection)
French modern art exhibition 1939 treasure 3 National Library of Latvia displayed via The European Library
Works by Raoul Dufy (public domain in Canada)
Raoul Dufy's artworks in context, Museum of modern art André Malraux

Illustrations 
 Jean Cocteau, Bertrand Guégan (1892-1943); L'almanach de Cocagne pour l'an 1920-1922, Dédié aux vrais Gourmands Et aux Francs Buveurs

See also

 List of Orientalist artists
 Orientalism

Notes

1877 births
1953 deaths
19th-century French painters
20th-century French painters
20th-century French male artists
Cubist artists
Fauvism
French male painters
French Impressionist painters
Modern painters
Orientalist painters
Artists from Le Havre
People of Montmartre
School of Paris
19th-century French male artists